Yolanda Jurado is a Spanish Paralympic swimmer. She won a silver medal at the 2000 Summer Paralympics.

Career 
At the 2000 Summer Paralympic Games, in Sydney, she competed in the Women's 50 m Backstroke S14, Women's 200 m Freestyle S14, Women's 100 m Freestyle S14, Women's 50 m Freestyle S14, and Women's 200 m Medley SM14. She won a silver medal in Women's 50 m Breaststroke SB14.

References 

Paralympic silver medalists
Paralympic competitors
Paralympic swimmers
Paralympic swimmers of Spain